The Anglican St George's Church was founded in the 13th century in the village of Wembdon within the English county of Somerset. The current building dates from the 14th and 15th century but was largely rebuilt in 1868 after a fire. It is a Grade II listed building.

History
The church was granted by William Testard, lord of Wembdon Manor, to St John's Hospital, Bridgwater in 1284. The current red sandstone building was built in the 14th and 15th century in a perpendicular style with a west tower.

In the churchyard is a 15th-century churchyard cross on an octagonal base. It is a Grade II listed building and ancient monument. There is also a set of stocks which were probably installed in the 17th century. They were moved to their current site and restored in 1916.

The church was badly damaged by fire in March 1868, and as the certificate for fire insurance had expired, had to be rebuilt with significant local aid. The tower survived from the original building, however the rest of the structure was rebuilt to designs by J.M. Hay, which included the extension of the nave.

Present day
The benefice of Wembdon is within the Sedgemoor deanery which is part of the Diocese of Bath and Wells.

St George's Church stands in the conservative evangelical tradition of the Church of England. It has passed resolutions to reject the ordination of women.

See also  
 List of ecclesiastical parishes in the Diocese of Bath and Wells

References

External links
 St George's Church, Wembdon

Grade II listed churches in Somerset
Grade II listed buildings in Sedgemoor
Conservative evangelical Anglican churches in England